Quthbullapur is a Village in Hyderabad in the Medchal-Malkajgiri district of the Indian state of Telangana. It is the mandal headquarters of Quthbullapur mandal in Malkajgiri revenue division. The mandal was a part of Ranga Reddy district before the re-organisation of districts in the state. It was a municipality prior to its merger into the Greater Hyderabad Municipal Corporation.

Demographics 
 India census, Quthbullapur had a population of 225,816. Males constitute 52% of the population and females 48%. Quthbullapur has an average literacy rate of 67%, higher than the national average of 59.5%: male literacy is 73%, and female literacy is 60%. In Quthbullapur, 14% of the population is under 6 years of age.

Election Information 
Quthbullapur Constituency is New Constituency. It is formed after Delimitation.
2009 Election is first election in this constituency.

Assembly Election Results in 2009 – Kuna Srisailam Goud Won with 34.12 votes %

Assembly Election Results in 2014 – K.P.Vivekanad Goud Won with 42.12 votes %

Assembly Election Results in 2018 – K.P.Vivekanad Goud

References 

Neighbourhoods in Hyderabad, India